Elaine H. Kim is an American writer, editor and professor emerita in Asian American Studies and Ethnic Studies at the University of California, Berkeley.  Kim retired from teaching in 2015. Her academic interests and research areas included Asian American cultural studies, art, literature, Asian diaspora studies, and Asian American feminism.

Academic background
Kim received her B.A. in English and American Literature from the University of Pennsylvania, M.A. in English and Comparative Literature from Columbia University, and her Ph.D. in Social Foundations of Education from University of California, Berkeley.

In 1995, Kim received an Honorary Doctorate in Humane Letters from the University of Massachusetts Boston, and in 2004, she received an Honorary Doctorate of Laws from the University of Notre Dame.

Academic career 
After joining the UC Berkeley faculty in 1974, Kim was a founding member of the Asian American Studies Program and the Ethnic Studies Department. In addition to teaching, Kim served UC Berkeley as a Faculty Assistant to the Chancellor for the Status of Women, Associate Dean of the Graduate Division, and Assistant Dean in the College of Letters and Science.

A pioneering scholar of Asian American Studies, Kim's research areas included Asian American literature, culture, and feminism, and she was often a source for commentary on contemporary issues related to the Asian American community, such as affirmative action, anti-Asian violence, and nativist and anti-immigrant rhetoric. Kim also studied the impact of the 1992 Los Angeles riots and civil disturbances on the Korean American community in light of the purported Korean cultural trait called han.
Kim has lectured and presented keynote addresses and papers in many US universities as well as at various conferences and universities in China, Japan, Korea, Taiwan, France, Germany, Italy, and Trinidad.
Selected academic publications include:

Asian American Literature: An Introduction to the Writings and Their Social Context, Philadelphia: Temple University Press, 1982
East to America: Korean American Life Stories (co-edited with Eui-Young Yu), New York: The New Press, 1996
Dangerous Women: Gender and Korean Nationalism, Routledge, 1997
Fresh Talk/Daring Gazes: Issues in Asian American Visual Art, University of California Press, 2003
Echoes Upon Echoes: New Korean American Writing, Temple University Press, 2003

Community activism 
Kim's decades of community activism include founding and leading several Asian American community organizations in the Bay Area. Kim helped start the Korean Community Center (now the Korean Community Center of the East Bay) in 1977. The Korean Community Center of the East Bay provides legal assistance for immigration issues and social services for the elderly.

Kim founded Asian Women United of California in 1976. Through her work with AWU, Kim wrote, produced, and directed documentaries about Asian American women such as Labor Women in 2002 and Slaying the Dragon: Reloaded in 2011. Kim was also a co-producer of the 1993 documentary, Sa-I-Gu: From Korean Women's Perspectives, which recounts the 1992 Los Angeles uprisings and their impact on the Korean American community.

In 1985, Kim secured the initial funding for the Asian Immigrant Women Advocates (AIWA), an Oakland-based organization to serve immigrant women garment and hotel workers.

Selected awards
Asian Pacific American Heritage Lifetime Achievement Award (City and County of San Francisco), 2012
Lifetime Achievement Award, Association for Asian American Studies, 2011
Association for Asian American Studies Book Award in Cultural Studies, 2005
 Hall of Outstanding Women at California, 1995
 Fulbright Fellowship, 1987-1988

References

External links
 Article "War Story" (c. 1950–1953, by Elaine H. Kim)
 Asian Women United of California
 Amazon book: Dangerous Women: Gender and Korean Nationalism
 Korea Policy Institute: Advisory Board profile
Korean Community Center of the East Bay
 Asian Immigrant Women Advocates
Council of Korean Americans
Women Make Movies

Living people
American writers of Korean descent
American sociologists
American women sociologists
University of California, Berkeley alumni
University of Pennsylvania alumni
Columbia Graduate School of Arts and Sciences alumni
University of California, Berkeley College of Letters and Science faculty
American literary critics
Women literary critics
1942 births
21st-century American women
American women critics